Somerset Township is a civil township of Hillsdale County in the U.S. state of Michigan.  The population was 4,532 at the 2020 census.

Communities
Storekeeper Don H. Elliott became its first postmaster on October 20, 1897. The office operated until December 14, 1903.
The FIPS place code is 41740. The ZIP Code is 49249.
The FIPS place code is 74540. The ZIP Code is 49281.
The FIPS place code. The ZIP Code is 49282.

Geography

The township contains numerous small lakes, as well as the  Somerset State Game Area.  The Grand River, which is the state's longest river, has its source within the township.

Major highways
 runs east–west through the northern portion of the township.

Demographics
As of the census of 2000, there were 4,277 people, 1,687 households, and 1,312 families residing in the township. The racial makeup of the township was 97.90% White, 0.37% African American, 0.21% Native American, 0.16% Asian, 0.05% Pacific Islander, 0.44% from other races, and 0.87% from two or more races. Hispanic or Latino of any race were 1.38% of the population.

There were 1,687 households, out of which 28.6% had children under the age of 18 living with them, 68.9% were married couples living together, 6.3% had a female householder with no husband present, and 22.2% were non-families. 18.6% of all households were made up of individuals, and 7.8% had someone living alone who was 65 years of age or older.  The average household size was 2.53 and the average family size was 2.88.

In the township the population was spread out, with 23.0% under the age of 18, 5.7% from 18 to 24, 26.2% from 25 to 44, 30.3% from 45 to 64, and 14.9% who were 65 years of age or older.  The median age was 42 years. For every 100 females, there were 101.7 males.  For every 100 females age 18 and over, there were 99.8 males.

The median income for a household in the township was $48,529, and the median income for a family was $51,278. Males had a median income of $43,973 versus $29,244 for females. The per capita income for the township was $22,462.  About 2.8% of families and 4.0% of the population were below the poverty line, including 1.8% of those under age 18 and 2.8% of those age 65 or over.

Education
The township is served by four separate public school districts.  The western portion of the township is served by North Adams-Jerome Schools, while the eastern portion is served by Addison Community Schools in Lenawee County.  A very small portion of the northern edge of the township surrounding parts of Lake LeAnn are served by Hanover-Horton Schools to the north in Jackson County.  Another very small portion of the northeast corner of the township is served by Columbia School District in Jackson County.

Notable residents
George A. Smith, state senator and representative

Images

References

External links
 Somerset Township official website

Townships in Hillsdale County, Michigan
Townships in Michigan